Dzüvürü Ward also known as Porterlane, is a ward located under Nagaland's capital city, Kohima.

Education
Educational Institutions in Dzüvürü Ward:

Colleges 
 Modern College, Kohima

Schools 
 Dzüvürü Public School
 Porterlane Government Middle School
 Schola 'Lojes' School

See also
 Municipal Wards of Kohima

References

External links
 Map of Dzüvürü Ward

Kohima
Wards of Kohima